Cierpigórz may refer to the following places:
Cierpigórz, Przasnysz County in Masovian Voivodeship (east-central Poland)
Cierpigórz, Siedlce County in Masovian Voivodeship (east-central Poland)
Cierpigórz, Żuromin County in Masovian Voivodeship (east-central Poland)